Gregorio Bressani (3 February 1703 – 12 January 1771) was an Italian philosopher.

Life 
Bressani was born in Treviso. He graduated from the University of Padua studying literature and philosophy. He was a dear friend of Francesco Algarotti although they had very different opinions. 
Bressani opposed Galilei and Newton theories in favor of a more scholastic approach. He died in Padua.

Works

References 

18th-century Italian philosophers
University of Padua alumni